Kasper Larsen (born 25 January 1993) is a Danish footballer who plays as a centre-back for Hungarian club Fehérvár FC.

Career

Club
In the 2011–2012 season, Larsen started first-team training in Odense Boldklub. He was integrated in the squad spring 2012 and gained 8 Superliga performances.

In February 2015, Larsen moved to Kazakhstan Premier League side FC Astana on a season-long loan.

In July 2015, Larsen returned to Odense from Astana in July without having played a match for Kazakhstan, and signed for Eredivisie side FC Groningen in August 2015.

On 4 August 2018, Larsen joined Swedish side IFK Norrköping on a free transfer, after his contract with FC Groningen expired earlier that summer.

International career
In 2012, Larsen was a regular in the Denmark u19 team.

Career statistics

Honours

Club
Astana
 Kazakhstan Super Cup (1): 2015

References

External links
 Profile at DBU
  Official Danish Superliga stats

1993 births
Living people
Association football defenders
Danish men's footballers
Denmark youth international footballers
Denmark under-21 international footballers
Danish expatriate men's footballers
Odense Boldklub players
FC Groningen players
IFK Norrköping players
Fehérvár FC players
Danish Superliga players
Eredivisie players
Allsvenskan players
Nemzeti Bajnokság I players
Footballers at the 2016 Summer Olympics
Olympic footballers of Denmark
Danish expatriate sportspeople in the Netherlands
Danish expatriate sportspeople in Sweden
Danish expatriate sportspeople in Hungary
Expatriate footballers in the Netherlands
Expatriate footballers in Sweden
Expatriate footballers in Hungary